The Sequatchie County Courthouse, on Cherry St. in Dunlap, Tennessee is a courthouse which was built in 1911.  It was listed on the National Register of Historic Places in 1980.

It was built at cost of $12,000 by W.K. Brown & Bros. contractors.  It is Colonial Revival in style.

The property also includes a one-story Board of Education building constructed in 1959.  It is brick, with brick laid in stretcher bond, and has a hipped roof which extends over a portico on its northwest side.

References

Courthouses in Tennessee
National Register of Historic Places in Sequatchie County, Tennessee
Colonial Revival architecture in Tennessee
Government buildings completed in 1911
1911 establishments in Tennessee